Harvel is a village in Kent, England.

Harvel may also refer to:

Harvel, Illinois, a village in Illinois, United States
Harvel Township, Montgomery County, Illinois

People with the surname
Edmund Harvel, 16th-century English diplomat
Luther Harvel (1905–1986), American baseball player, scout and manager